Sybra quadrimaculata is a species of beetle in the family Cerambycidae. It was described by Breuning in 1939. It is known from Sri Lanka.

References

quadrimaculata
Beetles described in 1939